Dr. Monica Kathina Juma (born 1963) is a Kenyan diplomat who currently serves as National Security Advisor to President William Ruto. She previously served as the Cabinet Secretary for Defence in the cabinet of President Uhuru Kenyatta.

Early life and education
Dr. Juma studied at the University of Nairobi for her BA and MA and University of Oxford, Certificate in Refugee Studies and where she also attained her Doctorate in Philosophy.

Diplomatic career
Dr. Juma has a long career in the diplomatic service, having served as Kenya's concurrent ambassador to Ethiopia, Djibouti, the African Union, the Inter-Governmental Authority on Development (IGAD) and the United Nations Economic Commission for Africa (UNECA), based out of Addis Ababa. On 27 June 2013, she was sworn in as the Principal Secretary, in the Kenya Ministry of Defence, serving in that capacity until she was moved to the Kenya Ministry of the Interior, as Principal Secretary.

Political career
Dr. Juma served as the Cabinet Secretary in the Ministry of Foreign Affairs (MFA) between January 2016 and February 2018.

She served as the Principal Secretary in the Department of Interior, Ministry of Interior and Coordination of National Government.

Prior to serving in the Ministry of Interior, Dr. Juma served as the Cabinet Secretary in the Ministry of Defence.

Other activities
Dr. Juma is a senior research fellow in the Department of Political Science, at the University of Pretoria in South Africa. She is also an adjunct faculty member at the African Centre for Strategic Studies of the National Defense University, in Washington DC in the United States of America. She has written and published extensively on the subjects of her specialization.

See also
 Amina Mohamed
 Raychelle Omamo
 Judy Wakhungu

References

 Delegation from Kenya composed of Foreign Affairs Cabinet Secretary Dr. Monica Juma, Director of Public Prosecutions Noordin Haji, Attorney General Paul Kihara, Director of Criminal Investigations George Kinoti and the director of Asset Recovery Agency returns Gold to Tanzania
 EAC Secretary General Amb Liberat Mfumukeko paid a courtesy call on the Cabinet Secretary for Foreign Affairs, Kenya, Hon. Monica Juma on 13 September 2019
 Kenya will be re-affirming its commitment to global multilateralism during the 74th session of the United Nations General Assembly, at a time when the global community is facing uncertainty on key issues such as climate change.

External links

 Website of the Kenya Ministry of Foreign Affairs
 Monica Juma, the brain behind Kenya's Kenyatta
 JUMA: Africans without visa will not be turned away upon arriving in Kenya As at 24 February 2018.

1954 births
Living people
Alumni of the University of Oxford
Female defence ministers
Female foreign ministers
Foreign ministers of Kenya
Kenyan women diplomats
21st-century Kenyan women politicians
21st-century Kenyan politicians
National Defense University faculty
University of Nairobi alumni
Women government ministers of Kenya
Defense ministers of Kenya